ARHGAP29 is a gene located on chromosome 1p22 that encodes Rho GTPase activating protein (GAP) 29, a protein that mediates the cyclical regulation of small GTP binding proteins such as RhoA.

Function
ARHGAP29 is expressed in the developing face and may act downstream of IRF6 in craniofacial development.

Structure
ARHGAP29 contains four domains including a coiled-coil region known to interact with Rap2, a C1 domain, the Rho GTPase domain, and a small C-terminal region that interacts with PTPL1.

Clinical Significance
The 1p22 locus containing ARHGAP29 was associated with nonsyndromic cleft lip/palate by genome wide association and meta-analysis.  A follow-up study  identified rare coding variants including a nonsense and a frameshift variant in patients with nonsyndromic cleft lip/palate. The finding of ARHGAP29's role in craniofacial development was discovered after the adjacent ABCA4 gene lacked functional or expression data to support it as the etiologic gene for nonsyndromic cleft lip/palate even though SNPs in the ABCA4 gene were associated with cleft lip/palate.

References

External links 
 
 

Genes on human chromosome 1